Bernard Eisenschitz (born 3 July 1944 in Saint-Calais, France) is a French film critic, subtitler and historian. He has also directed, produced and restored films.

Achievements

Eisenschitz modelled himself on the film historian Georges Sadoul, the definitive edition of whose masterwork, the Histoire générale du cinéma, he edited. Eisenschitz is an internationally known expert on Fritz Lang and Nicholas Ray, as well as Chris Marker and Robert Kramer. He has worked and published on Friedrich Wilhelm Murnau, Ernst Lubitsch, German cinema and the history of the Cinémathèque française, among other topics.

Eisenschitz wrote for Cahiers du cinéma between about 1967 and 1972, and for La nouvelle critique from 1970 to 1977. In 2001, he founded the periodical Cinéma. In the same year, he completed the definitive restoration of Jean Vigo's film L'Atalante and made a documentary on the film's different restorations entitled Les Voyages de L'Atalante.

He has on occasion appeared as an actor in films for director-friends of his, for example in Jacques Rivette's Out 1, The Mother and the Whore by Jean Eustache, Le Prestige de la mort by Luc Moullet, and in films by Otar Iosseliani, Wim Wenders et Amos Gitaï. He is a regular speaker at film screenings and festivals including the archival festival Il Cinema Ritrovato in Bologna.

The film critic Jacques Mandelbaum has said of Eisenschitz that "Traducteur, historien du cinéma, programmateur, réalisateur et acteur à l'occasion, Eisenschitz est l'une de ces figures secrètes de la cinéphilie dont l'érudition et la finesse de touche se rendent toujours disponibles à qui les sollicite"  [Translator, film historian, programmer, director and occasional actor, Eisenschitz is one of those secret cinephiliac figures whose erudition and subtlety are always at the disposal of those who ask].

Filmography
 1968 : Pick up  (short)
 1974 : Printemps 58 (short)
 2001 : Les Messages de Fritz Lang (short)
 2003 : Chaplin Today : Monsieur Verdoux (TV documentary)
2017: Tournage d’hiver: L’Atalante de Jean Vigo chutes et rushes

As actor

 1971: Out 1 (Jacques Rivette)
 1973: La maman et la putain (Jean Eustache)
 1985: Les Favoris de la lune (Otar Iosseliani)
 1993: Les Enfants jouent à la Russie (Jean-Luc Godard)
 2006: Le prestige de la mort (Luc Moullet)
 2008 : L'Idiot (Pierre Léon)
 2010: Chantrapas (Otar Iosseliani)
 2013 : Biette (Pierre Léon)
 2016 : Deux Rémi, Deux, adapted from the novel by Fiodor Dostoïevski, selected for Locarno International Film Festival, 2015

Publications
 Humphrey Bogart, Paris, Eric Losfeld, Le Terrain vague, 1967
 Ernst Lubitsch, Anthologie du cinéma, 1969
 Douglas Fairbanks, Anthologie du cinéma, 1969
 Le Cinéma allemand aujourd’hui, Paris, Documents, 1976; Paris, Nathan, coll. Cinéma 128, 1999
 Les restaurations de la Cinémathèque française, 1986
 Roman américain, les vies de Nicholas Ray, Christian Bourgois, 1990
 Man Hunt de Fritz Lang, Crisnée, Yellow Now, 1992
 Frank Tashlin (1994) (co-edited with Roger Garcia)
 Chris Marker, Festival de Pesaro, Dino Audino Editore, Rome, 1996
 Le Cinema allemand, 1999
 Gels et Dégels, Une autre histoire du cinéma soviétique, 1926-1968, 2000
 Points de départ : entretien avec Robert Kramer, 2001
 Fritz Lang au travail, Éditions Cahiers du cinéma, 2011

Notes
↑  « Fritz Lang était un des héros de ma famille, originaire, comme lui, d'Autriche et d'Allemagne. » Eisenschitz sur leMonde.fr↑  Willy et Bernard Eisenschitz↑  Bernard Eisenschitz sur Le Monde

References

External links

Bernard Eisenschitz page on France Culture (in French)

1944 births
Living people
French film critics
20th-century French historians
Subtitlers